Tordylium maximum, known as hartwort, is an annual or biennial flowering plant in the carrot family (Apiaceae).

Description

The lower leaves are pinnate, with two to five pairs of coarsely toothed leaflets. The upper leaves may be reduced to a single leaflet. The flowers are arranged in flat umbels, with 5–15 rays. Like other members of the genus Tordylium, the flowers are white, with the outer flowers having some much longer petals on the outer side of the umbel.

Taxonomy

Tordylium maximum was first described by Carl Linnaeus in 1753 in Species Plantarum.

Distribution

Tordylium maximum is a species of south and south central Europe, probably not native in the northern parts of its range. It has been found in south-east England, but only in one location in south Essex since 1875.

References

Apioideae
Plants described in 1753
Taxa named by Carl Linnaeus